The 1995 African Cup Winners' Cup football club tournament was won by Jeunesse Sportive de Kabylie in two-legged final victory against Julius Berger FC (now renamed to Bridge Boys FC). This was the twenty-first season that the tournament took place for the winners of each African country's domestic cup. Twenty-eight sides entered the competition, with KAC Marrakech and Horoya AC withdrawing before the 1st leg of the first round and Étoile du Congo withdrawing after the 1st leg of the first round. Another two teams withdrew during further stages of the competition; Wallidan before the 1st leg of the second round and AS Marsa before the 1st leg of the quarterfinals. No preliminary round took place during this season of the competition.

First round

|}

Second round

|}

Quarter-finals

|}

Semi-finals

|}

Final

|}

First leg

Second leg

Champion

External links
 Results available on CAF Official Website
 Results available on RSSSF

African Cup Winners' Cup
2